The 2015 American Athletic Conference softball tournament was held at the UCF Softball Complex on the campus of the University of Central Florida in Orlando, Florida, from May 7 through May 9, 2015. The event determined the champion of the American Athletic Conference for the 2015 NCAA Division I softball season.  Top-seeded  won the tournament and earned the American Athletic Conference's automatic bid to the 2015 NCAA Division I softball tournament. All games were televised; the quarterfinals and semifinals were shown on the American Digital Network while the championship was broadcast on ESPN2.

Former member Louisville won the only previous event, in 2014, and then departed for the Atlantic Coast Conference.

Format and seeding
The American's 7 teams were seeded based on their conference winning percentage from the round-robin regular season.  They then played a single elimination tournament, with the top seed receiving a single bye.

Results

Bracket

Game results

All-Tournament Team
The following players were named to the All-Tournament Team.

Most Outstanding Player
Samantha McCloskey was named Tournament Most Outstanding Player.  McCloskey was a catcher for UCF.

References

Tournament
American Athletic Conference softball tournament
AAC softball tournament